Alonzo Monroe Tillman (May 9, 1922 – March 31, 1998), better known as Pete Tillman, was an American football player and coach.  He played college football at the University of Oklahoma from 1946 to 1948 and professionally in the All-America Football Conference (AAFC) with the Baltimore Colts in 1949.  Tillman served as the head football coach  at the Municipal University of Wichita—now Wichita State University —from 1955 to 1956, compiling a record of 11–8–1.  Tillman's team won a share of the Missouri Valley Conference championship in 1955 with a record of 7–2–1.  Tillman served briefly as an assistant coach at the University of Washington in the spring of 1957.  He resigned in April to go into private business in Wichita, Kansas.

Head coaching record

References

External links
 
 

1922 births
1998 deaths
American football centers
Baltimore Colts (1947–1950) players
Oklahoma Sooners football players
Washington Huskies football coaches
Wichita State Shockers football coaches
People from Mangum, Oklahoma
Coaches of American football from Oklahoma
Players of American football from Oklahoma